Jack Warren Munn (1921–1993) was an Australian rugby league player who played in the 1940s and 1950s in the New South Wales premiership competition and was a state representative.

Career
Munn was a prop-forward who played with St. George immediately after World War II. After his discharge from the AIF, Jack Munn joined St George and played five seasons between 1946-1949 and 1951. 

He moved the Queensland in 1950, and represented Queensland against New South Wales in that year before returning to St George. Munn scored a try in the club's 1946 Grand final loss to Balmain.

He won a premiership with St. George when he played prop in the 1949 Grand Final. In 1950, Munn accepted a captain coach role for Ingham, Queensland and consequentially played representative football for Queensland. in 1950 and only a bad injury stopped him from playing for the Kangaroos.

Death
Munn died on 25 June 1993, aged 72.

References

St. George Dragons players
New South Wales rugby league team players
1921 births
1993 deaths
Australian military personnel of World War II
Rugby league props
Rugby league players from Sydney